Gmina Opatów may refer to either of the following administrative districts in Poland:
Gmina Opatów, Silesian Voivodeship
Gmina Opatów, Świętokrzyskie Voivodeship